The Department of Special Investigation (DSI) is a department of the Ministry of Justice of Thailand. It operates independently of the Royal Thai Police and is tasked with the investigation of certain "special cases". These include complex criminal cases, those affecting national security, those involving organised criminal organisations and those potentially implicating high-ranking government officials or police officers. As of June 24, 2020 the DSI is tasked to investigate and follow up on cases under the Prevention and Suppression of Torture and Enforced Disappearances if and when it becomes law on cases involving torture or forced disappearances.

The Department was formed on October 3, 2002 pursuant to the Ministries, Bureaus, and Departments Restructuring Act of 2002, in order to deal with rapid changes in global climates, political and societal changes, changes in violent crimes, technological development and exploitation of loopholes in the law. As of 2020, DSI has around 1,137 personnel. From 2004 to 2020, DSI investigated 2,860 cases, 2,587 of which are complete cases and 273 in-process cases.

The DSI is often referred to as Thailand's counterpart to the United States' Federal Bureau of Investigation (FBI). Since its inception, the DSI has seen conflicts with the police over jurisdiction and authority over cases, and department officials have publicly expressed concern that the department's work has been consistently subject to political interference.

Budget
The DSI's budget for fiscal year (FY) 2019 was 1,190 million baht, up from 1,102 million baht in FY2018.

Organization
 Office of the Director
 Law Department
 Office of Foreign Affairs and International Crimes
 Office of Financial Litigation 
 Office of Security 
 Office of Consumer and Environmental Protection 
 Office of Intellectual Property Litigation
 Office of Technology and Information Technology Case
 Office of Tax Lawsuit
 Office of Special Criminal 1
 Office of Special Criminal 2
 Office of Special Criminal 3
 Office of Technology and Information Monitoring Center
 Office of Policy and Strategy
 Office of Special Cases
 Office of Special Operations
 Office of Special Case Development and Support

Notable cases
 In 2004, human rights lawyer Somchai Neelapaijit was abducted in broad daylight in Bangkok. He had been representing a group of Muslim suspects allegedly involved in the South Thailand insurgency. Five police officers were charged with the abduction. They were acquitted in 2015. A year later the DSI dropped the case, having shown no results after 12 years of investigation.
 In 2014 the disappearance of Billy Rakchongcharoen, a Karen rights activist, resulted in his wife petitioning the agency to "take up the issue for consideration as a special case". The DSI rejected the petition by the activist's wife in 2017, citing a technicality: the couple was not legally married. Inexplicably, in June 2018 the DSI announced that it would reopen the investigation of Billy's disappearance as a "special case". Media reports intimated that the DSI's change of heart was due to pressure on the Prayut Chan-o-cha administration from international organizations regarding a case that was initially ignored, leading the media to doubt DSI's newfound commitment.
 In 2016, DSI opened a much publicized case against the abbot of Wat Phra Dhammakaya after some funds from an alleged embezzlement case was traced to donations made to the temple. The case has been described as a proxy war between supporters and opponents of the temple. One of the most criticized and debated aspects of DSI's handling of the case was its refusal to give the abbot his charges at the temple. Other criticisms of DSI's handling of the case include continuing to pursue the charges after the affected credit union withdrew charges, in violation of Thai Criminal Procedure Code Section 39(2).

Controversies

Tawatchai Incident 
On 30 August 2016 it was reported by DSI that one of the suspects it had detained was allegedly found unconscious and hanging in his cell. The suspect, Tawatchai Anukul, who was a suspect in a case of land deed fraud, was then rushed to Mongkutwattana Hospital where he was pronounced dead after several attempts at revival. DSI gave conflicting reports about how Tawatchai was found, with one official stating he likely committed suicide by hanging himself with his shirt. Another official gave a report stating he was found hanging by his socks. Tawatchai's family reported that DSI gave them contradictory information regarding his death. For instance, family members pointed out that the wound on Tawatchai's neck looked like it came from a wire rather than clothing.

A post-mortem examination revealed that Tawatchai had died of a ruptured liver, suggesting blunt trauma, as well as suffocation. DSI stated that the liver rupture was due to the hospital team performing CPR on Tawatchai in an attempt to revive him, which the hospital dismissed as impossible. DSI also announced that their CCTV servers had malfunctioned at the time and therefore there were no recordings from security cameras of the incident.

Article 44 death 
During the 23 day lock down of Wat Phra Dhammakaya in 2017 that junta leader Prayut Chan-o-cha ordered using article 44 of the interim constitution, one follower in the temple died of an asthma attack during the operation. According to temple spokespeople, the death was caused by the halting of an ambulance at the junta's blockade that delayed emergency response. DSI, however, claimed that the temple did not notify emergency services until after the follower had died. DSI stepped back from this statement later, when the temple revealed time stamped LINE messages asking for emergency services that supported Wat Phra Dhammakaya's account of the timeline. The authenticity of the messages was not disputed by DSI, however DSI still denied delaying emergency services.

Corruption in the ranks
 , former director-general of DSI until his dismissal in 2014, was accused by the NACC of hiding assets while serving as DSI director-general. The NACC found that Tarit had amassed unexplained wealth of 346.65 million baht during his 12 years at DSI. The supreme court found Tarit guilty and sentenced him to six months in jail and a fine of 10,000 baht, commuted to a three-month term and a fine of 5,000 baht because he confessed. It suspended the jail term for two years because he had not previously been sentenced to prison.

References

Government departments of Thailand
Law enforcement in Thailand
National law enforcement agencies
Ministry of Justice (Thailand)